Penicillium humicoloides is a species of the genus of Penicillium.

References

humicoloides
Fungi described in 2010